Karol Kučera was the defending champion but did not compete that year.

Richey Reneberg won in the final 6–4, 6–0 against Stéphane Simian.

Seeds
A champion seed is indicated in bold text while text in italics indicates the round in which that seed was eliminated.

  Arnaud Boetsch (first round)
  Albert Costa (first round)
  Richard Krajicek (quarterfinals)
  Byron Black (first round)
  Jan Siemerink (quarterfinals)
  Paul Haarhuis (semifinals)
  Mark Philippoussis (first round)
  Richey Reneberg (champions)

Draw

References
 1996 Continental Championships Draw

Men's Singles
Singles